Jean-Baptiste Matho (16 March 1663 – 16 March 1743) was a French composer of the Baroque era. Born in Montfort-sur-Meu near Rennes, his name was originally M. F. H. Thomassin. As a child, Matho attracted attention for the quality of his singing voice and he was sent to Versailles where he began a career as one of the king's musicians. In 1720, he became Master of the King's Music and was charged with the musical education of the young Louis XV alongside François Couperin and Jean-Joseph Mouret. He wrote several works for the stage, including the tragédie en musique Arion (1714) as well as ballets and other divertissements.

Sources
Le magazine de l'opéra baroque by Jean-Claude-Brenac (in French)

External links
 

1663 births
1743 deaths
French male classical composers
French Baroque composers
18th-century classical composers
18th-century French composers
18th-century French male musicians
17th-century male musicians